In grammar, reflexivity is a property of syntactic constructs whereby two arguments (actual or implicit) of an action or relation expressed by a single predicate have the same reference.

Reflexivity may be expressed by means of: reflexive pronouns or reflexive verbs. The latter ones may be constructed with the help of reflexive affixes (e.g., in Russian) or reflective particles (e.g., in Polish).

References

Generative syntax